Enrique Herrera may refer to:

 Enrique Olaya Herrera (1880–1937), Colombian journalist, politician and President of Colombia 
 Enrique Herrera (actor) (1904–1991), Cuban film actor in Mexico
 Enrique Herrera (wrestler), Peruvian wrestler